Nayudamma may refer to:

 Yarlagadda Nayudamma, Indian pediatric surgeon
 Yelavarthy Nayudamma (1922–1985), Indian chemical engineer and a scientist killed on Air India Flight 182